This is a list of the municipalities in the province of Huesca, in the autonomous community of Aragon, Spain. There are 202 municipalities in the province.

See also List of Aragonese comarcas.

See also

Geography of Spain
List of cities in Spain
Bolea

 
Huesca